Sarubujjili is a village in Srikakulam district of the Indian state of Andhra Pradesh. Sarubujjili mandal is bordered by Burja, Seethampeta, Hiramandalam, Jalumuru and Narasannapeta mandals of Srikakulam district.

Politics
Sarubujjili is under Amadalavalasa Assembly constituency in Andhra Pradesh and Srikakulam Parliamentary constituency.

List of elected members 

Assembly candidates details:
 Tammineni Paparao
 Boddepalli Rajagopala Rao
 Tammineni Seetaram
 Boddepalli Satyavathi

Parliamentary Candidate details:
 Boddepalli Rajagopala Rao
 Kanithi Viswanatham
 Kinjarapu Errannaidu
 Killi Kruparani

Transportation 

Sarubujjili is a major Four roads junction. Andhrapradesh State Highway 115 and 2 Connects Sarubujjili.

Sarubujjili Junction is a major four junction for Changing towards   Palkonda , Srimukhalingam , Jalumuru , Challavanipeta, Jarjangi, Amadalavalasa, Srikakulam, Hiramandalam, Kotturu, Battili .

More number of APSRTC Buses are operated between Srikakulam to Battili , connecting Sarubujjili village.

Sarubujjili is well Connected by most number of APSRTC Buses from Srikakulam Bus Stand to Battili , Parapuram Kotturu and Haddubangi villages.

There are autos , cabs , and taxis from srikakulam to Sarubujjili .

References 

Villages in Srikakulam district
Mandal headquarters in Srikakulam district